The Burnett Anderson Memorial Award for Excellence in Numismatic Writing is an annual award for numismatics. Presented annually to an author, journalist or researcher in recognition of their career contributions to the hobby, the award is sponsored by F&W Publications, and the winner is selected in a cooperative process by the American Numismatic Association (ANA), the American Numismatic Society (ANS) and the Numismatic Literary Guild (NLG).

Recipients
 2017 Donn Pearlman 
 2016 Scott A. Travers
 2015 Ursula Kampmann
 2014 Paul Gilkes
 2010 David T. Alexander
 2008 Wayne Homren
 2007 David Harper
 2001 Eric P. Newman

References

 

awards for numismatics